The Girolando is a breed of dairy cattle created in Brazil by crossing Gyr cattle, a Bos indicus breed which is resistant to hot temperatures and tropical diseases, with Holstein cows, a Bos taurus breed. Coat colors vary from black to black-and-white
Approximately 80% of the milk production in Brazil is produced from Girolando cows. A Girolando is 3/8 Gir and 5/8 Holstein.

References

External links 
Girolando calves in heat stress research

Cattle breeds originating in Brazil
Dairy cattle breeds
Cattle breeds